Esther is the eponymous heroine of the Book of Esther. Set in the Persian Achaemenid Empire, it tells how king Ahasuerus seeks a new wife after his queen, Vashti, is deposed for disobeying him. Esther (called Hadassah when first introduced) is chosen to fulfill this role due to her beauty. Ahasuerus' grand vizier, Haman, is offended by Esther's cousin and guardian, Mordecai, due to his refusal to prostrate himself before Haman. Consequently, Haman plots to have all the Jewish subjects of Persia killed, and convinces Ahasuerus to permit him to do so. However, Esther foils the plan by revealing Haman's eradication plans to Ahasuerus, who then has Haman executed and grants permission to the Jews to kill their enemies instead, as royal edicts (including the order for eradication issued by Haman) cannot be revoked under Persian law.

Her story provides the traditional explanation for the Jewish holiday of Purim, celebrated on the date given in the story for when Haman's order was to go into effect, which is the day that the Jews killed their enemies after the plan was reversed. The book exists in two distinct forms: a shorter Hebrew version found in Jewish and Protestant Bibles, and a longer Greek version found in Catholic and Orthodox Bibles.

Name
When introduced, in chapter 2 verse 7, Esther is given the Hebrew name Hadassah. This name is absent from the early Greek manuscripts, although present in the targumic texts, and was probably added to the Hebrew text in the 2nd century CE at the earliest to stress the heroine's Jewishness. The name "Esther" probably derives from the name of the Babylonian goddess Ishtar or from the Persian word cognate with the English word "star" (implying an association with Ishtar) though some scholars contend it is related to the Persian words for "woman" or "myrtle".

Narrative 

In the third year of the reign of King Ahasuerus of Persia the king banishes his queen, Vashti, and seeks a new queen. Beautiful maidens gather together at the harem in the citadel of Susa under the authority of the eunuch Hegai.

Esther, a cousin of Mordecai, was a member of the Jewish community in the Exilic Period who claimed as an ancestor Kish, a Benjamite who had been taken from Jerusalem into captivity. She was the orphaned daughter of Mordecai's uncle, another Benjamite named Abihail. Upon the king's orders, Esther is taken to the palace where Hegai prepares her to meet the king. Even as she advances to the highest position of the harem, perfumed with gold and myrrh and allocated certain foods and servants, she is under strict instructions from Mordecai, who meets with her each day, to conceal her Jewish origins. The king falls in love with her and makes her his Queen.

Following Esther's coronation, Mordecai learns of an assassination plot by Bigthan and Teresh to kill King Ahasuerus. Mordecai tells Esther, who tells the king in the name of Mordecai, and he is saved. This act of great service to the king is recorded in the Annals of the Kingdom.

After Mordecai saves the king's life, Haman the Agagite is made Ahasuerus' highest adviser, and orders that everyone bow down to him. When Mordecai (who had stationed himself in the street to advise Esther) refuses to bow to him, Haman pays King Ahasuerus 10,000 silver talents for the right to exterminate all of the Jews in Ahasuerus' kingdom. Haman casts lots, Purim, using supernatural means, and sees that the thirteenth day of the Month of Adar is a fortuitous day for the genocide. Using the seal of the king, in the name of the king, Haman sends an order to the provinces of the kingdom to allow the extermination of the Jews on the thirteenth of Adar. When Mordecai learns of this, he tells Esther to reveal to the king that she is Jewish and ask that he repeal the order. Esther hesitates, saying that she could be put to death if she goes to the king without being summoned; nevertheless, Mordecai urges her to try. Esther asks that the entire Jewish community fast and pray for three days before she goes to see the king; Mordecai agrees.

On the third day, Esther goes to the courtyard in front of the king's palace, and she is welcomed by the king, who stretches out his scepter for her to touch, and offers her anything she wants "up to half of the kingdom". Esther invites the king and Haman to a banquet she has prepared for the next day. She tells the king she will reveal her request at the banquet. During the banquet, the king repeats his offer again, whereupon Esther invites both the king and Haman to a banquet she is making on the following day as well.

Seeing that he is in favor with the king and queen, Haman takes counsel from his wife and friends to build a gallows upon which to hang Mordecai; as he is in their good favors, he believes he will be granted his wish to hang Mordecai the very next day. After building the gallows, Haman goes to the palace in the middle of the night to wait for the earliest moment he can see the king.

That evening, the king, unable to sleep, asks that the Annals of the Kingdom be read to him so that he will become drowsy. The book miraculously opens to the page telling of Mordecai's great service, and the king asks if he had already received a reward. When his attendants answer in the negative, Ahasuerus is suddenly distracted and demands to know who is standing in the palace courtyard in the middle of the night. The attendants answer that it is Haman. Ahasuerus invites Haman into his room. Haman, instead of requesting that Mordecai be hanged, is ordered to take Mordecai through the streets of the capital on the Royal Horse wearing the Royal Robes. Haman is also instructed to yell, "This is what shall be done to the man whom the king wishes to honor!"

After spending the entire day honoring Mordecai, Haman rushes to Esther's second banquet, where Ahasuerus is already waiting. Ahasuerus repeats his offer to Esther of anything "up to half of the kingdom". Esther tells Ahasuerus that while she appreciates the offer, she must put before him a more basic issue: she explains that there is a person plotting to kill her and her entire people, and that this person's intentions are to harm the king and the kingdom. When Ahasuerus asks who this person is, Esther points to Haman and names him. Upon hearing this, an enraged Ahasuerus goes out to the garden to calm down and consider the situation.

While Ahasuerus is in the garden, Haman throws himself at Esther's feet asking for mercy. Upon returning from the garden, the king is further enraged. As it was the custom to eat on reclining couches, it appears to the king as if Haman is attacking Esther. He orders Haman to be removed from his sight. While Haman is being led out, Harvona, a civil servant, tells the king that Haman had built a gallows for Mordecai, "who had saved the king's life". In response, the king says "Hang him (Haman) on it".

After Haman is put to death, Ahasuerus gives Haman's estate to Esther. Esther tells the king about Mordecai being her relative, and the king makes Mordecai his adviser. When Esther asks the king to revoke the order exterminating the Jews, the king is initially hesitant, saying that an order issued by the king cannot be repealed. Ahasuerus allows Esther and Mordecai to draft another order, with the seal of the king and in the name of the king, to allow the Jewish people to defend themselves and fight with their oppressors on the thirteenth day of Adar.

On the thirteenth day of Adar, the same day that Haman had set for them to be killed, the Jews defend themselves in all parts of the kingdom and rest on the fourteenth day of Adar. The fourteenth day of Adar is celebrated with the giving of charity, exchanging foodstuffs, and feasting. In Susa, the Jews of the capital were given another day to kill their oppressors; they rested and celebrated on the fifteenth day of Adar, again giving charity, exchanging foodstuffs, and feasting as well. 

The Jews established an annual feast, the feast of Purim, in memory of their deliverance. Haman having set the date of the thirteenth of Adar to commence his campaign against the Jews, this determined the date of the festival of Purim.

Historicity 
Although the details of the setting are entirely plausible and the story may even have some basis in actual events, the book of Esther is a novella rather than history. Persian kings did not marry outside of seven Persian noble families, making it unlikely that there was a Jewish queen Esther, and in any case the historical Xerxes's queen was Amestris. The name Ahasuerus is equivalent to Xerxes (both deriving from the Persian Khshayārsha), and Ahasuerus is usually identified in modern sources as Xerxes I, who ruled between 486 and 465 BCE, as it is to this monarch that the events described in Esther are thought to fit the most closely.

There is some speculation that the story was created to justify the Jewish appropriation of an originally non-Jewish feast. The festival which the book explains is Purim, which is explained as meaning "lot", from the Babylonian word puru. There are wide-ranging theories regarding the origin of Purim: one popular theory says the festival has its origins in a historicized Babylonian myth or ritual in which Mordecai and Esther represent the Babylonian gods Marduk and Ishtar, others trace the ritual to the Persian New Year, and scholars have surveyed other theories in their works Some scholars have defended the story as real history, but the attempt to find a historical kernel to the narrative "is likely to be futile".

Interpretations 

The tale opens with Esther as beautiful and obedient, but also a relatively passive figure. During the course of the story, she evolves into someone who takes a decisive role in her own future and that of her people. According to Sidnie White Crawford, "Esther's position in a male court mirrors that of the Jews in a Gentile world, with the threat of danger ever present below the seemingly calm surface." Esther is related to Daniel in that both represent a "type" for Jews living in Diaspora, and hoping to live a successful life in an alien environment.

According to Susan Zaeske, by virtue of the fact that Esther used only rhetoric to convince the king to save her people, the story of Esther is a "rhetoric of exile and empowerment that, for millennia, has notably shaped the discourse of marginalized peoples such as Jews, women, and African Americans", persuading those who have power over them.

Persian culture 

Given the great historical link between Persian and Jewish history, modern day Persian Jews are called "Esther's Children". A building venerated as being the Tomb of Esther and Mordechai is located in Hamadan, Iran, although the village of Kfar Bar'am in northern Israel also claims to be the burial place of Queen Esther.

Depictions of Esther 

There are several paintings depicting Esther. The Heilspiegel Altarpiece by Konrad Witz depicts Esther appearing before the king to beg mercy for the Jews, despite the punishment for appearing without being summoned being death. Esther Before Ahasuerus by Tintoretto (1546–47, Royal Collection) shows what became one of the most commonly depicted parts of the story. Esther's faint had not often been depicted in art before Tintoretto. It is shown in the series of cassone scenes of the Life of Esther attributed variously to Sandro Botticelli and Filippino Lippi from the 1470s. In other cassone depictions, for example by Filippino Lippi, Esther's readiness to show herself before the court is contrasted to Vashti's refusal to expose herself to the public assembly.

Esther was regarded in Catholic theology as a typological forerunner of the Virgin Mary in her role as intercessor Her regal election parallels Mary's Assumption and as she becomes queen of Persia, Mary becomes queen of heaven; Mary's epithet as 'stella maris' parallels Esther as a 'star' and both figure as sponsors of the humble before the powerful.

Contemporary viewers would probably have recognized a similarity between the faint and the motif of the Swoon of the Virgin, which was very common in depictions of the Crucifixion of Jesus.
The fainting became a much more popular subject in the Baroque painting of the following century, with examples including Esther Before Ahasuerus (Tintoretto) by Artemisia Gentileschi.

In Christianity 
Esther is commemorated as a matriarch in the Calendar of Saints of the Lutheran Church–Missouri Synod on May 24.

Esther is recognized as a saint in the Eastern Orthodox Church, commemorated on the Sunday before Christmas. "The Septuagint edition of Esther contains six parts (totaling 107 verses) not found in the Hebrew Bible. Although these interpretations originally may have been composed in Hebrew, they survive only in Greek texts. Because the Hebrew Bible's version of Esther's story contains neither prayers nor even a single reference to God, Greek redactors apparently felt compelled to give the tale a more explicit religious orientation, alluding to "God" or the "Lord" fifty times." These additions to Esther in the Apocrypha were added approximately in the second or first century BCE.

The story of Esther is also referenced in chapter 28 of 1 Meqabyan, a book considered canonical in the Ethiopian Orthodox Tewahedo Church.

Music 
 Marc-Antoine Charpentier, Historia Esther, H.396, for soloist, chorus, strings and continuo, 1677.
 George Frideric Handel, Esther, with a libretto based on a play by Jean Racine, 1718 and 1732.
 Elisabeth Jacquet de la Guerre, Esther, for soprano and continuo, 1708.

See also 
 Shushandukht

Notes

References

Citations

Bibliography

.

 
Christian female saints from the Old Testament
Heroes in mythology and legend
Jewish royalty
Order of the Eastern Star
People celebrated in the Lutheran liturgical calendar
People whose existence is disputed
Women in the Hebrew Bible
Tribe of Benjamin